Neil Maskell (born 1976) is an English actor, writer and director who is known for his appearances in British crime and horror films such as The Football Factory and Kill List.

Early life 
Maskell was born in London. As a youth, he played football for Long Lane JFC as a full back. He first trained in acting at the Anna Scher Theatre in Islington, London, where he attended classes from the age of 11, and studied at the Miskin Theatre, Dartford at North West Kent College from 1992. He later worked as a director at the Miskin Theatre.

Career

Film 
Maskell's film career began in 1997 with an appearance as Schmuddie in Gary Oldman's directorial debut Nil by Mouth. His leading role in the 2011 thriller Kill List attracted positive reviews from critics and saw him nominated for the Best Actor award at the British Independent Film Awards.

Television 
Maskell's first television appearance was in 1991 in the ITV police drama The Bill. Between 1992 and 2002, he made a further five appearances on the show, portraying a different character each time. He has had one-off roles in a number of other popular British serial dramas such as Casualty, London's Burning,  Soldier Soldier. His most regular television roles have been in the 2005 comedy series Mike Bassett: Manager, in the comedy sketch show The Wrong Door, and in the 2013–2014 thriller drama action series Utopia. Since 2015, he has been a series regular in sci-fi thriller Humans. In 2019 Maskell played prime minister Winston Churchill in the series finale of Peaky Blinders.

Between 2018 and 2020 he played the recurring character Winkle in the BBC One sitcom King Gary, friend and employee of the titular character played by Tom Davis. Maskell has previously worked with Davis in Murder in Successville (where he played Frankie Boyle in one episode),The Warm-Up Guy and The Morgana Show.

In 2022, Maskell played Detective Inspector Brent Hyatt in the ITV drama, Litvinenko, detailing the final days and subsequent murder investigation into the death of Russian defector Alexander Litvinenko.

Personal life 
Maskell is a supporter of Arsenal.

Filmography

Film

Television

References

External links 

English male film actors
English male television actors
Living people
Male actors from London
Alumni of North West Kent College
1976 births
21st-century English male actors
20th-century English male actors